Herbert Leslie Baldock (9 May 1887 – 24 December 1956)  was an Australian politician who represented the South Australian House of Assembly seat of Torrens from 1944 to 1947 for the Labor Party.

References

1887 births
1956 deaths
Members of the South Australian House of Assembly
Australian Labor Party members of the Parliament of South Australia
20th-century Australian politicians